George Girdler Smith (September 8, 1795 – December 18, 1878) was an engraver in Boston. He kept a studio on Washington Street. Collaborators included William B. Annin (Annin & Smith), Charles A. Knight and George H. Tappan (Smith, Knight & Tappan).

Smith was born in Danvers, Massachusetts. He belonged to several civic and social groups in Boston, including the Massachusetts Charitable Mechanic Association, Boston Light Infantry, and the Freemasons. "In the year 1819 he was initiated a Freemason in Columbian Lodge, and in 1826 became its master, holding the position, at intervals of time, for 7 years. ... He was subsequently master of the Massachusetts Lodge, and deputy grand master in 1837-1839." He died December 18, 1878, in Boston.

Image gallery
Engravings by Smith

See also
 Annin & Smith

References

Sources

External links

 WorldCat. Smith, George Girdler 1795-1878
 Bostonian Society. Works by G.G. Smith.
 Museum of Fine Arts, Boston. Works by G.G. Smith.
 Massachusetts Historical Society. Work by Smith
 Boston Public Library. Plan of Boston comprising a part of Charlestown and Cambridge, by G.G. Smith, 1846. Later versions: 1851, 1855, 1857,   1858, 1859, 1860.

1795 births
1878 deaths
American engravers
Artists from Boston
19th century in Boston